The 1993 Kilkenny Senior Hurling Championship was the 99th staging of the Kilkenny Senior Hurling Championship since its establishment by the Kilkenny County Board. The championship began on 13 August 1993 and ended on 7 November 1993.

Glenmore entered the championship as defending champions, however, they were beaten by Fenians at the quarter-final stage.

On 7 November 1993, Dicksboro won the championship after a 2–09 to 1–09 defeat of Fenians in the final at Nowlan Park. It was their fourth championship title overall and their first title since 1950.

Adrian Ronan (5-12) and Billy Purcell (1-24) were the championship's joint-top scorers.

Team changes

To Championship

Promoted from the Kilkenny Intermediate Hurling Championship
 Young Irelands

From Championship

Relegated to the Kilkenny Intermediate Hurling Championship
 Graignamanagh

Results

First round

Relegation playoffs

Quarter-finals

Semi-finals

Finals

Championship statistics

Top scorers

Overall

Single game

References

Kilkenny Senior Hurling Championship
Kilkenny Senior Hurling Championship